In Islam, Hārūn ibn ʿImrān, the Biblical Aaron (son of Amram), is a prophet and messenger of God, and the older brother of the prophet Musa (Moses). He along with his brother preached the Israelites to the Exodus.

Quranic account

The Quran contains numerous references to Aaron, both by name and without name. It says that he was a descendant of Abraham and makes it clear that both he and Moses were sent together to warn the Pharaoh about God's punishment. It further adds that Moses had earlier prayed to God to strengthen his own ministry with Aaron and that Aaron helped Moses as he too was a prophet, and very eloquent in matters of speech and discourse. The Quran adds that both Moses and Aaron were entrusted to establish places of dwelling for the Israelites in Egypt, and to convert those houses into places of worship for God.

The incident of the Golden Calf as it is narrated in the Quran paints Aaron in a positive light. It adds that Aaron tried his best to stop the worship of the Golden Calf, which was built not by Aaron but by a wicked man by the name of 'As-Samiri'. When Moses returned from Mount Sinai, he rebuked Aaron for allowing the worship of the idol, to which Aaron pleaded with Moses to not blame him when he had no role in its construction. The Quran then adds that Moses here lamented the sins of Israel, and said that he only had power over himself and Aaron.

Aaron is later commemorated in the Quran as one who had a "clear authority" and one who was "guided to the Right Path". It further adds that Aaron's memory was left for people who came after him and he is blessed by God along with his brother The Quran also says that people called ‘Isa's mother Maryam (Mary) a "sister of Harun" Muslim scholars debated as to who exactly this "Harun" was in terms of his historical persona, with some saying that it was a reference to Aaron of the Exodus, and the term "sister" designating only a metaphorical or spiritual link between the two figures, all the more evident when Mary was a descendant of the priestly lineage of Aaron, while others held it to be another righteous man living at the time of Christ by the name of "Aaron". Most scholars have agreed to the former perspective, and have linked Mary spiritually with the actual sister of Aaron, her namesake Miryam, whom she resembled in many ways. The Quran also narrates that, centuries later, when the Tabut (Ark of the Covenant) returned to Israel, it contained "relics from the family of Moses and relics from the family of Aaron".

Aaron in Muhammad's time
Muhammad speaks of Aaron in many of his sayings. In the event of the Mi'raj, his miraculous ascension through the Heavens, Muhammad is said to have encountered Aaron in the fifth heaven. According to old scholars, including Ibn Hisham, Muhammad, in particular, mentioned the beauty of Aaron when he encountered him in Heaven. Martin Lings, in his biographical Muhammad, speaks of Muhammad's wonderment at seeing fellow prophets in their heavenly glory:

Aaron was also mentioned by Muhammad in likeness to ‘Ali. Muhammad had left ‘Ali to look after his family, but the hypocrites of the time begun to spread the rumor that the prophet found ‘Ali a burden and was relieved to be rid of his presence. ‘Ali, grieved at hearing this wicked taunt, told Muhammad what the local people were saying. In reply, the Prophet said: "They lie, I bade thee remain for the sake of what I had left behind me. So return and represent me in my family and in thine. Art thou not content, O ‘Ali, that thou should be unto me as Aaron was unto Moses, save that after me there is no prophet."

Tomb of Aaron

According to one Islamic tradition, the tomb of Aaron is located on Jabal Harun (Mountain of Aaron), near Petra in Jordan, with another tradition placing it in Sinai.

A 14th-century Mamluk mosque stands there with its white dome visible from most areas in and around Petra.

References

Bibliography 

 
 
 
 
 

Moses

Hebrew Bible prophets of the Quran